In computer science, a storage record is:
 A group of related data, words, or fields treated as a meaningful unit; for instance, a Name, Address, and Telephone Number can be a "Personal Record".
 A self-contained collection of information about a single object; a record is made up of a number of distinct items, called fields.
 In IBM mainframes, a record is a basic unit of device-to-program data transfers. Mainframe files, properly called data sets, are traditionally structured collections of records, as opposed to modern byte stream access files. Records may have a fixed length or variable length.

In Unix-like systems, a number of programs (for example, awk, join, and sort) are designed to process data consisting of records (called lines) each separated by newlines, where each record may contain a number of fields separated by spaces, commas, or some other character.

See also
 Block (data storage)
 Object composition
 Record (computer science)
 Row (database)
 User-defined type

Computer data storage